The following is a list of episodes for the British situation comedy You Rang, M'Lord? that aired from 1988 to 1993. All episodes were approximately 50 minutes long.

Series overview

Episodes

Pilot (1988)

Series 1 (1990)

Series 2 (1990)

Series 3 (1991)

Series 4 (1993)

References

External links

Lists of British sitcom episodes